BombShellShocked is the fourth album (third full-length album) from the Eric Stuart Band (ESB) in which Eric Stuart is the songwriter and lead singer. This album was released in 2002 under the Rev Up Records label (unlike other ESB albums, which are under Stuart's own independent label, Widow's Peak Records).  One of the songs on this album is “Blood Red Rose,” in which Stuart plays acoustic guitar and sings in the absence of the band, much the same way as he opened as a solo act for Chicago (1995, 1997, 1998), Jethro Tull (1997), and Hall and Oates (1997, 1998), and toured as a solo act with Ringo Starr (1997), Lynyrd Skynyrd (1997), and Peter Frampton (1999).  Another song is “A Boy In Love With You,” in which guitars and drums are absent, and Stuart sings instead with the accompaniment of piano, violins, viola, and cello.  The artwork depicts items such as Stuart’s own star-shaped belt buckle, his Batman ring, and other items.  The dedication on the album reads, “Dedicated to the victims and families of the tragic events of 9/11.  Your memory will always live in our hearts.  We will never forget.”

Track listing
"Sad Day For Love" – 3:22 ©2001
"Revelation" – 4:03 ©2000
"The Remedy" – 4:47 ©1995
"Paint The Town Tonight" – 3:09 ©2000
"A Bad Seed To Sow" – 4:50 ©2001
"Blood Red Rose" – 3:08 ©2001
"Sooner Or Later" – 3:38 ©2000
"Damned" – 4:10 ©2000
"A Boy In Love With You" – 3:10 ©1998
"The Second Time Around" – 6:49 ©2001

Personnel
Eric Stuart - lead vocals, acoustic guitar, rhythm guitar, keyboards
Phil Nix - lead guitar, rhythm guitar, vocals, slide guitar
Questar Welsh - vocals, lead guitar
Kevin Merritt - keyboards, accordion, vocals, horn arrangements, piano, choral arrangements, string arrangements
Jenna Malizia - vocals
Mason Swearingen - bass, vocals
Jagoda - drums, percussion, vocals
Dan Schlessinger - saxophone
David Smith - trumpet
Elizabeth Dotson-Westphalen - trombone
Julie Reyburn - vocals
Darren Dunstan - vocals
David Gurland - vocals
Karen Mack - vocals
Louis Cortelezzi - saxophone
Asmira Woodward-Page - violin
Joe Brent - violin
Lisa Simonelli - viola
Vivian Penham - cello
All songs written by Eric Stuart ©2002 Little Black Book (BMI)
Produced by Eric Stuart
Engineered and mixed by Questar Welsh

External links
 Ericstuart.com
 Pecky Pudgeon Reports on the Eric Stuart Band

2002 albums
Eric Stuart Band albums